The Babe City Rollers is a women's flat track roller derby league based in Bemidji, Minnesota. Founded in 2009, Babe City is a member of the Women's Flat Track Derby Association (WFTDA).

History and organization
The league was founded in 2009 by two local women: Shannon Murray, inspired by watching a Windy City Rollers bout, and Sara Bronczyk, a former figure skater. By early 2010, it had members with ages ranging from 19 to 55, totaling more than twenty skaters. It played its first bout in February of that year.

Babe City was accepted into the Women's Flat Track Derby Association Apprentice Program in July 2010, and became a full member of the WFTDA in June 2011.

Babe City Rollers is a member-run, non profit sports league that is committed to active community involvement. Each home bout helps raise money for area charities, including Nameless Coalition for the Homeless, Great River Rescue (formally Beltrami Humane Society), and Support Within Reach.

Rankings

 NR = no end-of-year ranking assigned

References

Bemidji, Minnesota
Roller derby leagues established in 2009
Roller derby leagues in Minnesota
2009 establishments in Minnesota